2018 Blaublitz Akita season. The annual club slogan was "志 ". Former manager Shuichi Mase replaced Sugiyama on July 12.

Squad
As of 2018.

J3 League

Standings

Emperor's Cup

Other games

Gallery

References

External links
 J.League official site

Blaublitz Akita
Blaublitz Akita seasons